Santa Clara (Spanish for "Saint Clare") is a city in Santa Clara County, California. The city's population was 127,647 at the 2020 census, making it the eighth-most populous city in the Bay Area. Located in the southern Bay Area, the city was founded by the Spanish in 1777 with the establishment of Mission Santa Clara de Asís under the leadership of Junípero Serra.

Santa Clara is located in the center of Silicon Valley and is home to the headquarters of companies such as Intel, Advanced Micro Devices, and Nvidia. It is also home to Santa Clara University, the oldest university in California, and Levi's Stadium, the home of the National Football League's San Francisco 49ers, and Cedar Fair's California's Great America Park.  Santa Clara is bordered by San Jose on all sides, except for Sunnyvale and Cupertino to the west.

History
Prior to the arrival of Europeans in the 18th century, the Tamien tribe of the Ohlone nation of Indigenous Californians had inhabited the area for several millenium.

Spanish period
The first European to visit the valley was José Francisco Ortega in 1769. The Spanish began to colonize California with 21 missions and the Mission Santa Clara de Asis was founded in 1777.

Mexican period
The Battle of Santa Clara, one of the last battles of the Conquest of California, was fought between a contingent of Californios, led by Francisco Sánchez, against the invading American forces.

American period

In 1851, Santa Clara College was established on the grounds of the original Mission. In 1852, Santa Clara was incorporated as a town; it became state-chartered by 1862.

For the next century, the economy centered on agriculture since orchards and vegetables were thriving in the fertile soil. By the beginning of the 20th century, the population had reached 5,000 and stayed about the same for many years.

In 1905, the first public high-altitude flights by humans were made over Santa Clara in gliders designed by John J. Montgomery. The semiconductor industry, which sprouted around 1960, changed the city and surrounding Valley of Heart's Delight; little of its agricultural past remains.

Santa Clara's first medical hospital was built in 1963. This structure, on Kiely Boulevard, was replaced in 2007 with a new Kaiser Permanente medical center located on Lawrence Expressway at Homestead Road.

Santa Clara was also home to a major mental health facility, Agnews State Hospital. According to the National Park Service, more than 100 persons were killed at this site in the 1906 earthquake. The site is the former home to Sun Microsystems and is listed in the National Register of Historic Places.

In 1963, Santa Clara City Council voted to knock down the eight-block grid of Downtown Santa Clara, in order to receive federal funding for urban renewal. Since 2017, there has been a grassroots movement to rebuild Santa Clara's historic downtown.

Geography

Santa Clara is drained by three seasonal creeks, all of which empty into the southern portion of San Francisco Bay; these creeks are San Tomas Aquino Creek, Saratoga Creek, and Calabazas Creek.

There are some significant biological resources within the city including habitat for the burrowing owl, a species of special concern in California due to reduction in habitat from urban development during the latter 20th century. This owl uses burrows created by ground squirrels and prefers generally level grasslands and even disturbed areas. Coyotes have also become active in the area in recent years.

Climate
Most of the annual rainfall comes in the winter months; the summer months are generally rainless.

Demographics

2010

The 2010 United States census reported that Santa Clara had a population of 116,468. The ethnic makeup of Santa Clara was 52,359 (45.0%) White, 3,154 (2.7%) African American, 579 (0.5%) Native American, 43,889 (37.7%) Asian (13.6% Indian, 6.9% Chinese, 6.2% Filipino, 3.9% Vietnamese, 3.0% Korean, 1.5% Japanese), 651 (0.6%) Pacific Islander, 9,624 (8.3%) from other races, and 6,212 (5.3%) from two or more races. There were 22,598 people (19.4%) who identified as Hispanic or Latino; 14.6% of Santa Clara's population was of Mexican ancestry.

The Census reported that 113,272 people (97.3% of the population) lived in households, 2,860 (2.5%) lived in non-institutionalized group quarters, and 336 (0.3%) were institutionalized.

There were 43,021 households, out of which 14,477 (33.7%) had children under the age of 18 living in them, 21,817 (50.7%) were opposite-sex married couples living together, 4,081 (9.5%) had a female householder with no husband present, 2,038 (4.7%) had a male householder with no wife present.  There were 2,146 (5.0%) unmarried opposite-sex partnerships, and 312 (0.7%) same-sex married couples or partnerships. 10,906 households (25.4%) were made up of individuals, and 2,945 (6.8%) had someone living alone who was 65 years of age or older. The average household size was 2.63.  There were 27,936 families (64.9% of all households); the average family size was 3.18.

The age distribution of the population was as follows: 24,774 people (21.3%) were under the age of 18, 12,511 people (10.7%) aged 18 to 24, 41,876 people (36.0%) aged 25 to 44, 25,628 people (22.0%) aged 45 to 64, and 11,679 people (10.0%) who were 65 years of age or older.  The median age was 34.1 years. For every 100 females, there were 102.0 males.  For every 100 females age 18 and over, there were 100.9 males.

The homeowner vacancy rate was 1.3%; the rental vacancy rate was 4.6%.  53,694 people (46.1% of the population) lived in owner-occupied housing units and 59,578 people (51.2%) lived in rental housing units.

Economy

Santa Clara owns and operates an electric utility called Silicon Valley Power. In 2005 Silicon Valley Power brought online the Donald Von Raesfeld (DVR) Power Plant. The new combined cycle gas turbine plant produces 147 megawatts of electricity for the city and its residents. As a result, the going rate for electricity in Santa Clara is considerably cheaper than that offered by Northern California's dominant utility, Pacific Gas and Electric.

Advanced Micro Devices (AMD), Affymetrix, Agilent Technologies, Applied Materials, Arista Networks, Aruba, Auditoria.AI, Brillio, Chegg, Cloudera, Coherent, FileMaker, Hortonworks, Infoblox, Intel, Intevac, Marvell, McAfee, Move inc, National Semiconductor, Nvidia, OmniVision, Ooyala, Palo Alto Networks, Rovi, ServiceNow, SVB Financial Group, Trident Microsystems and Veritas Technologies are among the companies headquartered in Santa Clara. The United States office of Namco Bandai Games is in Santa Clara.

Top employers
According to the city's 2022 Annual Comprehensive Financial Report, the top employers in the city are:

Government
The current mayor of Santa Clara is Lisa Gillmor. Its city councilmembers are: Kathy Watanabe (District 1), Raj Chahal (District 2), Karen Hardy (District 3), Kevin Park (District 4), Suds Jain (District 5), and Anthony Becker (District 6).

The city operates the Santa Clara City Library, which is not part of the Santa Clara County Library District.

Education

Santa Clara Unified School District is the public school district that serves Santa Clara and small portions of Sunnyvale and North San Jose.  The city is home to nineteen K–8, elementary, and high schools. Many of the schools are named for former farmers, ranchers, and other notable Santa Clara residents such as Bowers and Bracher elementary schools, Buchser Middle School, Wilcox High School, Santa Clara High School, and Mission Early College High School.

A small part of the city however is served by Cupertino High School and its feeder schools in the nearby town of its namesake.

Private schools in Santa Clara include the Saint Clare School (the oldest elementary school in California) and the  Granada Islamic School (Islamic school, grades K-12)

Higher education
Colleges and universities in Santa Clara include Santa Clara University (private Jesuit university), Mission College (public community college), UC Santa Cruz Silicon Valley extension campus, and Golden State Baptist College (private Baptist college).

Culture

Santa Clara is also home to California's Great America, an amusement park currently operated by Cedar Fair, L.P.

Nearby is the Santa Clara Convention Center, one of Silicon Valley's largest event and meeting venues. Santa Clara also offers several museums such as the Intel Museum, Triton Museum of Art, and the Harris – Lass historical house. The Our Lady of Peace Shrine is notable for its  statue which is visible from Highway 101. The Mission City Center for Performing Arts is the city's venue for theatrical productions and entertainment.

Sports

The Santa Clara Broncos are the Division I NCAA athletic programs of Santa Clara University. Santa Clara sponsors 19 different teams, most of which compete in the West Coast Conference. The red and white of the Santa Clara Broncos is featured on the flag of the city, as is the Mission which lies at the heart of the campus.

The George F. Haines International Swim Center is home and host to numerous local, regional, and international competitive swimming matches.

The Santa Clara Vanguard, a competitive marching music organization, has been headquartered in Santa Clara since its inception. The organization runs and operates a winter guard, an indoor percussion ensemble, and two drum and bugle corps, all of which compete across the country every year. All four ensembles have been very successful competitively, especially the two drum corps, one of which has won 6 Open Class titles and the other 7 World Class titles. The latter is the only drum corps that has made finals every year since the beginning of Drum Corps International.

The San Francisco 49ers NFL football team has its headquarters and practice facilities in Santa Clara. On Wednesday, November 8, 2006, the 49ers announced their intention to move the team to Santa Clara in time for the fall 2014 season, after negotiations failed with the city of San Francisco to build a new stadium.

Santa Clara will host multiple matches during the 2026 FIFA World Cup at Levi's Stadium.

Transportation

Santa Clara has two major train stations: the Santa Clara – Great America station and the Santa Clara station. Both stations are served by Amtrak's Capitol Corridor train and the Altamont Corridor Express (ACE); the latter is also served by Caltrain.

The city is served by the VTA light rail, which operates four stations: Reamwood station, Old Ironsides station, Great America station, and Lick Mill station.

Santa Clara is located adjacent to San Jose International Airport.

Notable people

Sister cities
, Santa Clara has three sister cities:
Coimbra, Portugal]
Izumo, Shimane, Japan
Limerick, Ireland

References

External links 

 
 Santa Clara Convention and Visitors Bureau website
 Silicon Valley Central Chamber of Commerce, formally Santa Clara Chamber of Commerce website

 
1852 establishments in California
Cities in Santa Clara County, California
Cities in the San Francisco Bay Area
Incorporated cities and towns in California
Populated places established in 1777
Spanish mission settlements in North America